Hiss or Hissing may refer to:

 Hiss (electromagnetic), a wave generated in the plasma of the Earth's ionosphere or magnetosphere
 Hiss (surname)
 Hissing (manhwa), a Korean manhwa series by Kang EunYoung
 Noise (electronics) or electronic circuit hiss, white noise present at low level in all electronic circuits
 Sibilant, a group of consonants that have a hissing or hushing sound
 Tape hiss, high-frequency noise on analogue magnetic tape recordings
 The Hiss, a five piece rock band from Atlanta, Georgia
 Honda Ignition Security System, a vehicle immobiliser
 A sound made by snakes and various other animals as a warning; see List of animal sounds

In fiction
 King Hiss, the villainous king of the Snake Men in Mattel toy line Masters of the Universe
 Sir Hiss, Prince John's fictional sidekick in the 1973 animated Disney movie Robin Hood
 H.I.S.S., High Speed Sentry, a fictional vehicle in the G.I. Joe universe

See also
 His (disambiguation)
 Animal communication, including hissing to deter predators